Kino Świat ("world cinema") is a Polish independent film distributor and producer. The company was founded in Warsaw in 2001. It was honored by the Polish Film Institute for film distribution in 2011 and 2012.

References

External links 

2001 establishments in Poland
Companies based in Warsaw
Film production companies of Poland
Film distributors of Poland
Video on demand services